Amos Valentin Anderson (3 September 1878, Kimito, Finland – 2 April 1961, Kimito, Finland) was the owner of Finland's largest Swedish-language newspaper, Hufvudstadsbladet, and a patron of the arts.

Amos Anderson grew up in the Southwestern Archipelago of Finland and studied business in Turku. He started his career in insurance, and spent two years in continental Europe studying finance and insurance. He started in press in 1905 by publishing a professional magazine for the insurance sector. His career with daily newspapers started in 1911, and in 1909 he founded a printing house together with  Viktor Ek and  J. O. Wasastjerna.

Anderson was a Member of Parliament in 1922–1927 and a presidential elector in 1937, 1940 and 1943.

The story has it that Amos Anderson had two sides to his personality: by day he was a determined businessman, and by night sensitive and sociable patron of the arts and culture. He sponsored refurbishments of churches in Turku, Pargas and Kimito, and repairs of the Swedish theatre in Helsinki. He collected 250 works of modern art, which he left in his will to a foundation he founded, Konstsamfundet.

In 1913, Anderson commissioned architects Wäinö Palmqvist and Einar Sjöström to design a building on Yrjönkatu. The building would function as both Anderson's private living quarters and office space for his businesses. After Anderson's death in 1961, the building was converted into Amos Anderson Art Museum which opened its doors to the public in 1965.

References 

1878 births
1961 deaths
Finnish business executives
Newspaper executives
Finnish art collectors
Museum founders
Finnish patrons of the arts